An enkephalin is a pentapeptide involved in regulating nociception in the body.  The enkephalins are termed endogenous ligands, as they are internally derived and bind to the body's opioid receptors.  Discovered in 1975, two forms of enkephalin have been found, one containing leucine ("leu"), and the other containing methionine ("met"). Both are products of the proenkephalin gene.
 Met-enkephalin is Tyr-Gly-Gly-Phe-Met. 
 Leu-enkephalin has Tyr-Gly-Gly-Phe-Leu.

Endogenous opioid peptides
There are three well-characterized families of opioid peptides produced by the body: enkephalins, B-endorphin, and dynorphins. The met-enkephalin peptide sequence is coded for by the enkephalin gene; the leu-enkephalin peptide sequence is coded for by both the enkephalin gene and the dynorphin gene. The proopiomelanocortin gene (POMC) also contains the met-enkephalin sequence on the N-terminus of beta-endorphin, but the endorphin peptide is not  processed into enkephalin.

Effects on stress

Enkephalin is also considered a neuropeptide, which in the human body performs as an important signaling molecule in the brain. Enkephalins are found in high concentration in the brain as well as in the cells of adrenal medulla. In response to pain, norepinephrine, a hormone that is activated in fight-or-flight response is released, along with endorphins. A 2017 study indicates that this polypeptide may be linked to brain functioning during the stress response, especially in the hippocampus and prefrontal cortex. This research has suggested that, as part of the stress response, several met-enkephalin analogs have increased activity in the hippocampus, while leu-enkephalin analogs as well as somatostatins are downregulated during stress. Stressors may impact neuropeptides whose action is localized to a specific brain region.

Enkephalin receptor

The receptors for enkephalin are the delta opioid receptors and mu opioid receptors. Opioid receptors are a group of G-protein-coupled receptors, with other opioids as ligands as well. The other endogenous opioids are dynorphins (that bind to kappa receptors), endorphins (mu receptors), endomorphins, and nociceptin/orphanin FQ. The opioid receptors are ~40% identical to somatostatin receptors (SSTRs).

See also
 Endorphin
 Enkephalinase
 Opioid peptide
 Racecadotril
 RB-101

References

External links
 
 

Opioid peptides
Pentapeptides